The Hyperwomen (Portuguese: As Hiper Mulheres) is a 2012 Brazilian documentary film, directed by Fausto Carlos, Leonardo Sette, and Takuma Kuikuro, about the ritual performed by the women of the Kuikuro, an indigenous community living in the Upper Xingu.

References

External links
The Hyperwomen on Vimeo

2012 films
2010s Portuguese-language films
Brazilian documentary films
2012 documentary films